The 1954–55 British National League season was the first season of the British National League. Eleven teams participated in the league, and the Harringay Racers won the championship. The Dunfermline Vikings withdrew from the league after eleven games.

Regular season

External links
 Nottingham Panthers history site

References 

British
British National League (1954–1960) seasons
1954–55 in British ice hockey